The Hackney pony is a breed of pony closely related to the Hackney horse. Originally bred to pull carriages, they are used today primarily as show ponies.  The breed does not have its own stud book, but shares one with the Hackney horse in all countries that have an official Hackney Stud Book Registry.

History 
The Hackney Pony was originally developed by Christopher Wilson. He used Sir George, a Hackney stallion foaled in 1866, to breed with Fell Pony mares, and then interbred the offspring to make a fixed type of pony.   He desired to create not a miniaturized horse, but rather a true pony with such characteristics. Extracting the large trot and other characteristics of the hackney horse and applying them to this true type of pony, he was successful in creating the form which was desired. This is one case of an entire type of breed that is formed in a controlled, private environment. In addition to the mixing of Fell ponies and Hackney horses, the Hackney Pony probably also has much Welsh Pony blood.

First known as Wilson Ponies, they were usually kept out all year, wintering in the inhospitable Fells with little food or care. This developed the breed's great toughness and endurance. By the 1880s the breed was established, and was very much liked for its great trotting ability and class.

The breed was used in Great Britain as carriage horses and were also imported into the United States. They were considered to be very stylish to drive during the late nineteenth and early twentieth centuries, when automobiles were still uncommon. After horses were replaced by cars as a primary means of transportation, Hackney ponies, along with many other horse breeds, were deemed unable to contribute to society and declined considerably. After World War II, however,  the Hackney pony developed into primarily a show pony, and remain being bred for that purpose today.  Thus their drastic decline in numbers and plight toward extinction came to an end, and the breed was popularized once again.

Many Hackney pony breeders today continue to develop a quality, refined pony.   In the United States, Hackney ponies have also had considerable influence on the American version of the Shetland pony. They were crossbred with Shetlands to produce the American Shetland show pony of today, a type which displays many of the refined characteristics of the Hackney pony.  The Hackney has also influenced the miniature horse, adding refinement and action.

Characteristics

General appearance 
The Hackney pony may not be above  and usually range between 12 and 14 hh. It should have true pony characteristics, and should not be a scaled down version of the Hackney Horse.  The pony should have a small pony head, carried high, with alert and pricked ears and large, intelligent eyes. The neck should be muscular, arched, and carried proudly. Hackney ponies should have powerful shoulders, a compact back, and a light frame. The legs are strong with good joints, but the bone is usually fine. The feet are very hard, and are usually allowed to grow long in the toe to accentuate the action of the pony. The tail is often set and is carried high.  They usually have even more exaggerated action than the Hackney horse, knees rising as high as possible and hocks coming right under the body. The action should be fluid, spectacular, and energetic.

Colors 
Hackney ponies may be black, bay (which includes brown), or chestnut. Bay is by far the most common color, but black is also relatively common.  Chestnuts, on the other hand, are extremely rare; their color is usually particularly light, and chestnut ponies often possess flaxen manes and tails. Many hackneys also have some white markings. Due to the sabino gene, common in the breed, the Hackney Pony may have white markings on its body as well as on its legs and head. The sabino gene (possibly a gene complex), is generally unpredictable, so breeding solely for body white marks can be difficult.

Temperament 
The Hackney Pony also has a reputation for being tenacious and fearless, qualities that are seen in top-tier show ponies. They are very brave, alert, and active, and possess great stamina. Generally, they have pony character.  Hackneys have a reputation for being friendly toward humans, and are suitable for both show and as companion animals.

Show Types 

In the show ring, the Hackney pony is most commonly seen being driven in harness. They are also shown under saddle, usually as road ponies, and in hand as weanlings or yearlings.   The Hackney pony division recognizes six categories of harness exhibition: Hackney Pony (cob tail), Harness Pony, Hackney Roadster, Park Pleasure Driving, Show Pleasure Driving, and Country Pleasure Driving. Their world's championship is the Kentucky State Fair World's Championship Horse Show in Louisville, Kentucky, and their national championship is the American Royal in Kansas City, Missouri.

Most classes require both a “Park Trot,” executed in a highly collected manner and then exhibitors are given the command, “Show your pony,” which  permits an increase in speed to exhibit each pony to its best advantage. Excessive speed is undesirable and is penalized.

Hackney roadster 
Hackney roadsters, or Road ponies, like roadsters, are shown to a two-wheel bike, or sulky. The driver always wears racing silks, usually with their barn represented by the colors of the silks. Road ponies are judged upon their action when trotting, as well as their speed, conformation, and temperament.

In addition to being shown with a bike, road ponies are shown under saddle by junior exhibitors or hooked to a four-wheel wagon. Wagon classes are relatively new but growing in popularity; the World's Championship Horse Show offered a wagon class for the first time in 2006.

Hackney (cobtail) ponies 

In the Cobtail pony division, ponies are shown with a tightly braided mane and appear to have a docked tail (though usually created only by trimming the tail short, not actual docking). They are generally taller, for any height of pony is permitted to show in the division as long as it is still a pony, not exceeding 14.2 hands.

Harness ponies 
Harness ponies are perhaps the most elegant and beautiful of the hackney ponies. Whereas speed is a major factor among road ponies, harness ponies should be more collected, exhibiting a very animated and airy trot. A Hackney must be smaller  to show in the harness pony division, because it is required that the pony be  or under. They are shown to a four-wheel viceroy and possess a full mane and tail. The typical apparel for driving harness ponies is a suit for men, and a dress or other formal wear for women.

Pleasure ponies 

There are also three pleasure driving classes for the breed, Park Pleasure, Show Pleasure, and Country Pleasure. There are no height requirements except that the Hackney be a pony, and the pony can have a long or docked tail. Pleasure ponies are shown to a two-wheeled cart, and the driver usually wears more casual dress.  They are shown at a road gait, pleasure trot, and flat walk. Temperament is a more primary factor for judges; the pleasure pony should indeed be a pleasure to drive.

Other types 

Some Hackney ponies are shown in one or two pairs in harness, though classes which are designated for this are fairly rare.

See also

Hackney horse
Horse show
Fine harness
Driving (horse)

References

The Encyclopedia of Horses & Ponies, by Tamsin Pickeral, Barnes & Noble Books, p. 311.
 American Hackney Horse Society
 

Horse breeds
Horse breeds originating in England